Joseph Patrick Kelly (born March 17, 1956) is an American attorney and politician who is the 42nd lieutenant governor of Nebraska, since 2023. He served as the United States attorney for the District of Nebraska from 2018 to 2021. He formally serves as chief of the criminal division for the attorney general of Nebraska.

Early life and education
Kelly earned a Bachelor of Arts degree from University of Nebraska in 1978 and a Juris Doctor from the University of Nebraska College of Law in 1981.

Career
Kelly began his legal career as an associate with Berniger, Berg and Diverin Colorado Springs, Colorado, from 1987 to 1990. He then served as the deputy Lancaster County attorney and later as the chief deputy Lancaster County attorney. He has prosecuted a variety of crimes including homicide, robbery, sexual assault, and white collar.

He eventually rose to become the Lancaster County Attorney. On February 15, 2018, his nomination to be a U.S. attorney was confirmed by voice vote. He was sworn in on February 23, 2018. He has two children, Shannon and Thomas.

On February 8, 2021, he along with 55 other Trump-era attorneys were asked to resign. He resigned on February 28, 2021.

On April 5, 2022, Nebraska gubernatorial candidate Jim Pillen announced Kelly as his running mate.

References

External links
 Biography at U.S. Department of Justice

|-

|-

 

 

1956 births
21st-century American lawyers
District attorneys in Nebraska
Lieutenant Governors of Nebraska
Living people
People from Lexington, Nebraska
United States Attorneys for the District of Nebraska
University of Nebraska alumni